Jacob Nosovitsky was a Russian revolutionary who became a spy for the U.S  Department of Justice – agent N-100 – in 1919. He came to play a significant role in the emergent Comintern activity in America and elsewhere. 

Nosovitsky also became a major suspect in the Lindbergh kidnapping case during the 1930s. 
His FBI Files and the 1925 newspaper series describing his Red Scare exploits in Mexico are located at: http://lindberghkidnappinghoax.com/noso.htm

References

Russian spies
Year of birth missing
Year of death missing